Murad Taqqu (Arabic: مراد تقّو) is an Iraqi probabilist and statistician specializing in time series and stochastic processes. His research areas have included long-range dependence, self-similar processes, and heavy tails. He is a Professor of Mathematics at Boston University and received his Ph.D. from  Columbia University.  He has published over 250 papers, many of which are considered seminal work. He has co-authored or co-edited 9 books.

Education and career
Taqqu was born in Baghdad, Iraq, and grew up in Switzerland. As an undergraduate, he studied Physics and Mathematics at the École Polytechnique Fédérale de Lausanne. He pursued his PhD at Columbia University, during which time he studied with Benoit Mandelbrot. Between 1972 and 1974 Taqqu lectured at Hebrew University in Jerusalem and worked as a post-doctoral fellow at the Weizmann Institute in Rehovot, Israel. From 1974 to 1985, he was a faculty member at the School of Operations Research and Industrial Engineering at Cornell University. Since 1985, Taqqu has served as a professor in the Department of Mathematics and Statistics at Boston University.

Honors and awards 
 Dr. Taqqu's 1995 paper "On the Self-Similar Nature of Ethernet Traffic," co-authored with Will Leland, Walter Willinger, and Dan Wilson, won the William J. Bennett Award from the IEEE Communications Society.
 The same group was awarded the IEEE W.R.G. Baker Prize Award in 1996.
 The same four co-authors were recognized again, 11 years after the original publication, with the ACM/SIGCOMM Test of Time Award.
 Dr. Taqqu was named a Guggenheim Fellow in 1987.
 Dr. Taqqu's 2000 paper "Meaningful MRA initialization for discrete time series," co-authored with D. Veitch and P Abry, was named the best paper in signal processing by EURASIP.
 He was included in the 2019 class of fellows of the American Mathematical Society "for contributions to self-similar random processes and their applications to real world phenomena such as diverse internet traffic and hydrology".

Selected books 
 New Directions in Time Series Analysis, Part I. D. Brillinger, P. Caines, J. Geweke, E. Parzen, M. Rosenblatt and M.S. Taqqu, editors. "The IMA Volumes in Mathematics and its Applications". Series. Vol. 45. . Springer Verlag, New York, (1992).
 New Directions in Time Series Analysis, Part II. D. Brillinger, P. Caines, J. Geweke, E. Parzen, M. Rosenblatt and M.S. Taqqu, editors. "The IMA Volumes in Mathematics and its Applications". Series. Vol. 46. . Springer Verlag, New York, (1992).
 Stochastic Processes and Related Topics: In memory of Stamatis Cambanis 1943–1995. Ioannis Karatzas, Balram S. Rajput, Murad S. Taqqu, editors. Trends in Mathematics Series. . Birkhäuser, Boston (1998).
 Stable Non-Gaussian Random Processes: Stochastic Models with Infinite Variance. Gennady Samorodnitsky and Murad S. Taqqu, Chapman and Hall, New York (1994).
 A Practical Guide to Heavy Tails: Statistical Techniques and Applications. Robert J. Adler, Raisa E. Feldman and Murad S. Taqqu, editors. . Birkhäuser, Boston (1998).
 Theory and Applications of Long-Range Dependence. Paul Doukhan, Georges Oppenheim and Murad S.Taqqu editors. . Birkhäuser, Boston (2003).
 Wiener Chaos: Moments, Cumulants and Diagrams: A survey with Computer Implementation. Giovanni Peccati and Murad S. Taqqu. . Springer, (2011).

References

20th-century American mathematicians
21st-century American mathematicians
1942 births
Columbia University alumni
Boston University faculty
Living people
People from Baghdad
Iraqi mathematicians
École Polytechnique Fédérale de Lausanne alumni
Cornell University faculty
Iraqi statisticians
Fellows of the American Mathematical Society